Ipomoea bracteata is a species of plant in the bindweed family Convolvulaceae. It is endemic to Mexico.

References

bracteata
Taxa named by Antonio José Cavanilles